Robert M. Carmack (born 1934) is an academic anthropologist and Mesoamericanist scholar who is most noted for his studies of the history, culture and societies of contemporary Maya peoples. In particular he has conducted extensive research on the K'iche' (Quiché) Mayas of the Guatemalan Highlands in the context of the infiltration and migration of Nahuatl speaking peoples into the Maya cultural areas.

Carmack is an emeritus professor of anthropology at the State University of New York at Albany who for the last few years has been working as a senior Fulbright Scholar. Carmack has written several books on early Quiché-Mayan culture and linguistics, first and foremost the standard work on the K'iche' kingdom of Q'umarkaj/Utatlán.

Selected publications

Books
 Rebels of Highland Guatemala: The Quiche-Mayas of Momostenango. University of Oklahoma Press (1995).
 Historia Antigua de America Central: del Poblamiento a la Conquista. FLACSO, Costa Rica (1992).
 Harvest of Violence: The Maya Indians and the Guatemalan Crisis. University of Oklahoma Press (1988).
The Quiche-Mayas of Utatlan: The Evolution of a Highland Maya Kingdom. University of Oklahoma Press (1982).
Historia Social de los Quiches. Jose de Pineda Ibarra, Guatemala (1979)
Quichéan Civilization: The Ethnohistoric, Ethnographic and Archaeological sources. Berkeley and Los Angeles. University of California Press (1973).

Notes

Sources
Robert Carmack's Faculty page
Albany.edu report on Carmack's most recent studies

External links
 
Library Thing listing for Carmack

Living people
American Mesoamericanists
Mesoamerican anthropologists
Mayanists
20th-century Mesoamericanists
State University of New York faculty
1934 births